The Croatian Canoe Federation is the governing body of rowing in Croatia. It organizes the Croatian representation at international competitions and the Croatian National Championships.

The Federation was formed on August 6, 1939 in Zagreb. It became a member of the International Canoe Federation in 1992 and of the European Canoe Association in 1993.

References

National members of the European Canoe Association
Canoeing
1939 establishments in Croatia